Ain Dubai is the world's biggest and tallest Ferris wheel, located on Bluewaters Island, near the Dubai Marina in Dubai, United Arab Emirates.

Background

Hyundai Engineering & Construction and Starneth Engineering were appointed as the primary design and construction contractors, together with KCI, the engineers who designed and engineered the complete wheel structure including the installation engineering. Construction began in May 2015, anticipating completion in early to mid-2019. Further delays pushed the target opening to 20 October 2020, in order to coincide with Expo 2020, but this itself was postponed due to the COVID-19 pandemic. The wheel opened a year later on 21 October 2021.

Ain Dubai is  taller than the previous world's tallest observation wheel, the  High Roller, which opened in Las Vegas in March 2014.

The wheel carries up to 1,750 passengers in 48 cabins and provides views of Dubai Marina and landmarks such as Burj Al Arab, Palm Jumeirah, and Burj Khalifa.
Ain Dubai has not been operational since March 2022 for "periodic enhancements". A preliminary opening date has been set for the first quarter of 2023.

See also
 London Eye

References

External links
 
 Ain Dubai
 Ain Dubai Tickets

2020 establishments in the United Arab Emirates
Amusement rides introduced in 2020
Ferris wheels
Buildings and structures under construction in Dubai
Tourist attractions in Dubai
Dubai Marina